is a private university in Suzuka, Mie, Japan, established in 1991. The present name was adopted in 1998.

External links
 Official website 

Educational institutions established in 1991
Private universities and colleges in Japan
Universities and colleges in Mie Prefecture
1991 establishments in Japan